The Egoist (subtitled An Individualist Review) was a London literary magazine published from 1914 to 1919, during which time it published important early modernist poetry and fiction. In its manifesto, it claimed to "recognise no taboos", and published a number of controversial works, such as parts of Ulysses. Today, it is considered "England's most important Modernist periodical."

History
The Egoist was founded by Dora Marsden as a successor to her feminist magazine The New Freewoman, but was changed, under the influence of Ezra Pound, into a literary magazine. Pound got his benefactor John Quinn to buy him an editorial position in the magazine, and quickly it became a leading publication for imagist poetry. Its group of friends and contributors includes almost every writer of significance of the time, though some, like D. H. Lawrence (whose "Once" was published in the magazine in 1914), came to denounce it for "editorial sloppiness" and for the philosophical attitudes of its editorial staff. Among the work published in The Egoist is the work of James Joyce and T. S. Eliot, as well as letters and criticism.

Marsden was the editor in the first half of 1914, when it was a fortnightly; for most of its life it was a monthly. Editorship was taken over in July 1914 by Harriet Shaw Weaver. Assistant editors were Richard Aldington and Leonard A. Compton-Rickett, with H. D. When Aldington left in 1917 for the Army, his place was taken by T. S. Eliot, who was also working on Prufrock and other Observations at the time (published as a small book by The Egoist). When it folded in 1919, there were only 400 subscribers, down from 2,000 in 1911 when it was The Freewoman.

Notable contributions
T. S. Eliot, "Tradition and the Individual Talent", vol. 6, nos. 4 & 5 (September & December 1919).
James Joyce, A Portrait of the Artist as a Young Man, starting in 1914; three-and-a-half sections of Ulysses (1919)
Wyndham Lewis, Tarr, April 1916 – November 1917.
Charlotte Mew, "Fête", May 1914
William Carlos Williams, "The Wanderer" and seven other poems, March 1914; "Transitional" and three other poems, December 1914

References

Works cited

Edwards, Paul. "Futurism, Literature and the Market," in 
Eliot, Valerie. "Introduction," in 

Johnson, Jeri. "Composition and Publication History," in 
Longenbach, James. "'Mature Poets Steal': Eliot's Allusive Practice," in 
Matherer, Timothy. "T.S. Eliot's Critical Program," in

External links
 The Egoist at the Modernist Journals Project: cover-to-cover, searchable digital edition of all 6 volumes (comprising 74 issues) from No 1.1 (1 January 1914) to No. 6.5 (December 1919). PDFs of these issues may be downloaded for free from the MJP website.
 Articles online, from The Egoist Archive at nonserviam.com
Account of The Egoist, at Modernism Lab Essays, a Yale University website

1914 establishments in the United Kingdom
1919 disestablishments in the United Kingdom
Monthly magazines published in the United Kingdom
Defunct literary magazines published in the United Kingdom
Egoism
Biweekly magazines published in the United Kingdom
Magazines published in London
Magazines established in 1914
Magazines disestablished in 1919
T. S. Eliot
Imagism